Novacyt Group is an Anglo-French biotechnology group focused on clinical diagnostics, with offices in Camberley, Surrey, United Kingdom and Vélizy-Villacoublay, France. The company produces in vitro and molecular diagnostic tests, supplying an extensive range assays and reagents worldwide. Its business units include Primerdesign, Microgen Bioproducts and Lab21 Healthcare.

In January 2020 the company announced that its molecular diagnostics division, Primerdesign, had launched a molecular test for the 2019 strain of SARSr-CoV. The test was approved as eligible for procurement under the World Health Organization's (WHO) Emergency Use Listing process in April 2020, meaning that the test could be supplied by the United Nations and other procurement agencies supporting the COVID-19 response. In the same month Novacyt announced a collaboration with AstraZeneca, GlaxoSmithKline and the University of Cambridge to support the UK in its COVID-19 national screening programme at a new testing laboratory at the university's Anne McLaren laboratory.

References

External links
 Novacyt Group website
 Primerdesign website
 Microgen Bioproducts website
 Lab21 Healthcare website

Biotechnology companies of France
Companies listed on the London Stock Exchange
Companies listed on the Alternative Investment Market